Tell Me Why is the début studio album by American country music artist Jann Browne. Three singles from the album rose to positions on the Billboard Country Singles charts: "You Ain't Down Home" at #19, "Tell Me Why" at #18, and "Louisville" at #75. Also featured on the album is a cover of The Davis Sisters' "I Forgot More Than You'll Ever Know," a duet with veteran rockabilly artist Wanda Jackson. Emmylou Harris provides backing vocals on "Mexican Wind." The album rose to #46 on the Billboard Country Albums chart.

Track listing

Personnel
 Byron Berline - fiddle, mandolin 
 Michael Bowden - bass
 Jann Browne - vocals, background vocals
 Bill Bryson - bass
 James Burton - guitar
 Sam Bush - mandolin
 John Cowan - bass
 Iris DeMent - harp, harmony vocals
 Steve Fishell - resonator guitar, steel guitar, lap steel guitar, pedal steel, Weissenborn
 Béla Fleck - banjo
 Rosie Flores - background vocals
 Pat Flynn - acoustic guitar
 Glen D. Hardin - piano
 Emmylou Harris - harmony vocals
 Wanda Jackson - vocals
 John Jorgenson - mandolin, Spanish guitar
 Albert Lee - electric guitar, acoustic guitar
 Richard MacDonald - bass, acoustic guitar
 John Molo - drums
 Weldon Myrick - steel guitar, pedal steel
 Harry Stinson - background vocals  
 Billy Thomas - drums, percussion, background vocals 
 Wanda Vick - fiddle, acoustic guitar
 Don Whaley - bass, background vocals

Cover Version

In 2002 Dwight Yoakam covered "Louisville" for his box set 'Reprise Please Baby.'

Chart performance

References

1990 debut albums
Jann Browne albums
Curb Records albums